Rissoa lilacina is a species of minute sea snail, a marine gastropod mollusc or micromollusc in the family Rissoidae.

Description

Distribution
This marine species occurs at the south coast of the Channel in Calvados and Finistère, France

References

 Nordsieck, F. & García-Talavera, F. (1979). Moluscos Marinos de Canarias y Madera (Gastropoda). Aula de Cultura, Tenerife, 208 pp., 46 pls.
 de Kluijver, M. J.; Ingalsuo, S. S.; de Bruyne, R. H. (2000). Macrobenthos of the North Sea [CD-ROM]: 1. Keys to Mollusca and Brachiopoda. World Biodiversity Database CD-ROM Series. Expert Center for Taxonomic Identification (ETI): Amsterdam, The Netherlands. ISBN 3-540-14706-3. 1 cd-rom
 Manousis T., Kontadakis C, Mbazios G. & Galinou-Mitsoudi S. (2019). New records of Rissoidae (Mollusca: Gastropoda) for the Hellenic Seas with the description of Rissoa electrae n. sp. Xenophora Taxonomy. 26: 10-19.

External links
 Récluz, C. A. (1843). Catalogue descriptif de plusieurs nouvelles espèces de coquilles de France suivi d'observations sur quelques autres. Revue zoologique, par la Société Cuvierienne. 6: 5-12, 104-112, 228-238, 257-261
  Lovén, S. L. (1846). Index Molluscorum litora Scandinaviae occidentalia habitantium. Öfversigt af Kongliga Vetenskaps Akademiens Förhandlingar. (1846): 134-160, 182-204
 Thorpe C. (1844). British marine conchology; Being a descriptive catalogue, arranged according to the Lamarckian system, of the salt water shells of Great Britain. London: Edward Lumley. l + 267 pp
 Potiez, V. L. V. & Michaud, A. L. G. (1838). Galerie des mollusques, ou catalogue méthodique, descriptif et raisonné des mollusques et coquilles du Muséum de Douai. Tome 1, pp. xxxvi + 560 + 4 (Relevé des genres manquants; Errata). Atlas, pp. 1-56, pls I-XXXVII (= 1-37). Paris: Baillière
 Alder J. (1844). Descriptions of some new British species of Rissoa and Odostomia. Annals and Magazine of Natural History 13: 323-328, pl. 8
 Locard, A. (1886). Prodrome de malacologie française. Catalogue général des mollusques vivants de France. Mollusques marins. Lyon: H. Georg & Paris: Baillière. x + 778 pp
 Jeffreys J.G. (1862-1869). British conchology. Vol. 1: pp. cxiv + 341 (1862). Vol. 2: pp. 479 (1864). Vol. 3: pp. 394 (1865). Vol. 4: pp. 487 (1867). Vol. 5: pp. 259 (1869). London, van Voorst.

Rissoidae
Gastropods described in 1843